In Spite of Wishing and Wanting is a 1999 soundtrack by David Byrne for the performance of the same name by the Ultima Vez dance company. It features original compositions as well as remixes from Byrne's previous album Feelings. Byrne sold the album through his web site and live performances for a limited time.

As indicated in the liner notes, Byrne first saw Ultima Vez in Seattle in 1991 and kept in contact for several years before deciding to write the music for a show based on the fiction of Julio Cortázar.

Critical reception
Writing for The New York Times, Anna Kissingoff explored the live performance and when reviewing Byrne's soundtrack, she wrote that it "includes the sound effects he calls ambient sound, offers a strong pulse, and its vocal fragments seem to lure the listener into a wind tunnel. It serves its purpose."

Track listing
All tracks composed by David Byrne, except where noted
"Horses" – 4:31
"Sleeping Up" – 12:13
"Speech" – 5:26
"Saïd & the Ants" – 4:18
"Fear" – 2:32
"Fuzzy Freaky" (DJ Food Mix) (Byrne, Danielle Fossatti) – 6:19
"Danceonvaselinesuperextendedremix" – 19:45

Personnel
David Byrne – vocals, guitar, bass guitar, programming, sampling, production
Ad Cominotto – accordion, organ
Paul De Clerck – viola
François Deppe – cello
DJ Food – remixing on "Fuzzy Freaky" (DJ Food Mix)
Didier Fontaine – drums, percussion
Morcheeba Productions – production on "Danceonvaselinesuperextendedremix"
Eric Sleichim – baritone saxophone
Pierre Vervloesem – bass guitar

References

External links

Ultima Vez's homepage on the production

1999 soundtrack albums
Albums produced by David Byrne
David Byrne soundtracks
Luaka Bop soundtracks
Theatre soundtracks